Gustavo Adrián Maccarone (born March 17, 1987 in Itajú, Brazil) is a Brazilian offensive midfielder (176 cm high / 75 kg weight) currently playing for Huracán de San Rafael of the Torneo Argentino B in Argentina.

Teams
  Tiro Federal 2008–2011
  Sportivo Belgrano 2011–2014
  Huracán de San Rafael 2014–

External links
 
 

1987 births
Living people
Brazilian footballers
Brazilian expatriate footballers
Tiro Federal footballers
Expatriate footballers in Argentina
Association football midfielders